Mughal Road is the road between Bufliaz, a town in the Poonch district, to the Shopian district, in the union territory of Jammu and Kashmir, India.

The road connects Poonch and Rajouri to Srinagar in the Kashmir valley, and reduces the distance between Shopian and Poonch from 588 km to 126 km. It also provides an alternative route into the Kashmir valley off the Jammu-Srinagar highway. The road passes through Buffliaz, Behramgalla, Chandimarh, Dogray (Dogran), Godawan, Poshana, Chattapani, Peer Ki Gali, Aliabad, Zaznar, Dubjian, Hirpora, and Shopian.

History 
A route linking Hirapur (modern Hirpora) in the Kashmir Valley with Poonch via the Pir Panjal Pass (Peer Ki Gali) has been used from ancient times. During the period of the sultans, it was extended to Bhimber. Historian Mohibbul Hasan says it played an important role during this period.

After conquering the Kashmir Valley, the emperor Akbar strengthened the route into an "Imperial Road" stretching from Lahore to Kashmir. In modern times, the route has been referred to as the "Mughal Road".

The route has also been traditionally used by the nomadic pastoral communities of Gujjars and Bakerwals for their seasonal migration.

Construction 
The new road was proposed in the 1950s to improve the economy of the Kashmir valley. Then chief Minister Sheikh Abdullah took up this project in 1979 and named it the "Mughal Road", but it came to a halt as terrorism took over. Bafliaz Bridge on the road was blown up by the terrorists.

Actual construction began in October 2005 with a target of completion in March 2007 and an estimated cost of 255 crore rupees. A conservation trust petitioned the Supreme Court to stop construction, citing the disturbance to animals in the Hirpora Wildlife Sanctuary, especially the endangered Markhor goat; and claiming the road would get early snowfall in winter and hence would not serve as an alternate route to the existing Jammu-Srinagar highway. However, the Court gave conditional permission for the construction of the road.

Construction was to be completed in December 2008, but was delayed for a number of reasons, including the Amar Nath land row. The road was opened on 12 July 2009 for inspection by state legislators, officials, engineers, and others. It was supposed to be thrown open for light vehicles in October 2010 but the law-and-order situation in Kashmir in 2010 imposed delays. A double-lane road was completed and opened for light vehicles in August 2012.

A Mughal Road Car Rally has been held annually since 2010. It covers 600 km, including the picturesque stretch across Pir Panjal.

See also
 Aharbal
 Shopian
 Pahalgam
 Kulgam
 Kashmir Railway

References 

Roads in Jammu and Kashmir